The 'ndrina (plural: 'ndrine) is the basic unit in the 'Ndrangheta, a criminal organization from Calabria.

Province of Catanzaro

Badolato
 Gallelli

Borgia
 Giacobbe

Curinga
 Fruci

Guardavalle
 Gallace 
 Mandalari

Isola di Capo Rizzuto
 Costanzo
 Gaglianesi

Lamezia Terme
 Giampà 
 Gualtieri 
 Iannazzo 
 Torcasio

Marcedusa
 Trovato

Soverato
 Sia

Province of Cosenza

Amantea
 Gentile

Cariati
 Critelli

Cassano allo Ionio
 Faillace 
 Forastefano

Castrovillari
 Abbruzzese

Cetraro
 Muto

Corigliano
 Carelli

Cosenza
 Bruni
 Cicero
 Lanzino
 Perna 
 Pino

Rossano
 Acri

Province of Crotone

Cirò
 Farao

Crotone
 Vrenna

Cutro
 Dragone 
 Grande Aracri

Isola di Capo Rizzuto
 Arena 
 Nicoscia 
 Paparo

Petilia Policastro
 Carvelli
 Ferrazzo

Rocca di Neto
 Iona

Province of Reggio Calabria

Reggio Calabria
 Barreca
 Condello (also in Fiumara and Villa San Giovanni) 
 De Stefano-Tegano
 'Ndrina Di Giovine
 Latella 
 Labate
 Libri
 Lo Giudice
 Nasone
 Rosmini
 Serraino (a.k.a. Serraino-DiGiovine)
 Tripodo
 Zindato

Melito Porto Salvo
 Iamonte

Sant'Eufemia d'Aspromonte
 Araniti (also in Sanbatello)

Villa San Giovanni
 Imerti

Gioia Tauro plain (Province of Reggio Calabria)

Castellace
 Mammoliti

Cinquefrondi
 Petullà

Cittanova
 Albanese (also Laureana di Borrello) 
 Facchineri

Gioia Tauro
 Molè
 Piromalli

Melicucco
 Guerrisi Mercuri

Palmi
 Bruzzise
 Gallico 
 Parrello

Polistena
 Longo Versace

Rizziconi
 Crea  
 Franconieri

Rosarno
 Pesce
 Bellocco

Seminara
 Gioffrè
 Santaiti

Sinopoli
 Alvaro
 Violi

Taurianova
 Avignone 
 Maio
 Zagari

Locride (Province of Reggio Calabria)

Africo
 Morabito 
 Palamara

Careri
 Cua

Ciminà
 Varacalli

Condofuri
 Rodà

Gioiosa Ionica
 Belfiore
 Ierinò 
 Ursino

Laureana di Borrello
 D'Agostino

Locri
 Cataldo
 Cordì

Marina di Gioiosa Ionica
 Aquino
 Mazzaferro

Monasterace
 Ruga

Platì
 Agresta
 Barbaro
 Marando
 Molluso
 Papalia
 Sergi

San Lorenzo
 Paviglianiti

San Luca
 Nirta-Strangio
 Pelle-Vottari
 Giorgi
 La Maggiore
 Romeo

Siderno
 Gallace-Novella
 Commisso
 Costa
 Macrì

Province of Vibo Valentia

Briatico
 Accorinti

Filadelfia
 Anello

Filandari
 Soriano

Gerocarne
 Loielo

Limbadi
 Mancuso

San Gregorio d'Ippona
 Fiarè

Sant'Onofrio
 Bonavota

Serra San Bruno
 Vallelunga

Tropea
 La Rosa
 Piserà

Vibo Valentia
 Cracolici
 Lo Bianco
 Tripodi

See also
Honoured Society
List of criminal organizations
Organized crime in Italy
Siderno Group

References

External links
  Relazione annuale sulla 'ndrangheta, Commissione parlamentare di inchiesta sul fenomeno della criminalità organizzata mafiosa o similare (Relatore: Francesco Forgione), February 2008 (Maps of 'ndrine per province)

Calabrian society
Italian
 

it:'Ndrina